Jalwa is a 1987 Indian Hindi-language action film directed by Pankaj Parashar and produced by Gul Anand. The film stars Naseeruddin Shah and Archana Puran Singh in the title roles. The film is set in Goa, where it was mostly shot. The film was remade in Telugu as Trinetrudu, with Chiranjeevi.

Plot 
Kapil's (Naseeruddin Shah) younger brother, Buntu, dies as a result of a drug overdose. Kapil vows to put an end to drugs and drug-dealers, by joining the police. He soon attains the title of C.I.D. Inspector. He lives in Bombay with his mom (Kamini Kaushal).

One day, his friend from Goa, Albert Pinto (Pankaj Kapoor), is killed in front of him. He vows to avenge his death, but the local police will not permit him to do so. They assign this incident to another inspector. Frustrated, Kapil travels to Goa. Once there, he finds out that he has no powers as a policeman, and the Goa police regard him as a nuisance. He attempts to uncover Albert's death, with the help of Jojo (Archana Puran Singh), but instead gets into brawls, is arrested, and is escorted by the local police, back to Bombay.

Kapil escapes from police custody, and soon he is on the run, not only from the police, but local goons also, who will not hesitate to kill him.

Cast 
Naseeruddin Shah: Inspector Kapil
Archana Puran Singh: Jyothi/Jojo
Pankaj Kapur: Albert Pinto
Tejeshwar Singh: DD
Dalip Tahil: Champ (DD's Henchman)
Rohini Hattangadi: Sribaby
Saeed Jaffrey: Yakub Saeed
Johny Lever: Muthu (the masseur)
Amitabh Bachchan: special appearance
Remo Fernandes: as himself
Farah Khan: a dancer in the "Feeling Hot Hot" song
Cyrus Broacha: Jyothi's younger brother
A K Hangal: Jyothi's dad
Akash Khurana: Inspector Hosi Wadia
Satish Kaushik: Inspector Ramu Ghadiali
Javed Khan: Taxi driver
Kamini Kaushal

Soundtrack 
The music was composed by Anand–Milind & Remo Fernandes and lyrics were penned by Sameer.

References

External links 

1980s Hindi-language films
1980s crime action films
1987 action thriller films
1980s crime thriller films
1987 films
Films scored by Anand–Milind
Indian crime action films
Indian crime thriller films
Indian action thriller films
Films set in Goa
Hindi films remade in other languages
Indian remakes of American films
Cultural depictions of Amitabh Bachchan
Films directed by Pankuj Parashar
Fictional portrayals of the Maharashtra Police
Films about drugs
Films set in Mumbai
Films shot in Goa